Gintaras Ambraska (born 5 February 1975) is a Lithuanian judoka.

Achievements

References
 

1975 births
Living people
Lithuanian taekwondo practitioners
Lithuanian male judoka
Place of birth missing (living people)
20th-century Lithuanian people